A50, A.50 or A-50 may refer to:

Aviation
 Beriev A-50, a Russian airborne early warning aircraft
 Fiat A.50, a 1928 Italian seven-cylinder, air-cooled radial engine for aircraft
 A-50 Golden Eagle, a light attack variant of the South Korean KAI T-50 Golden Eagle advanced trainer aircraft
 Junkers A50, a German sports plane of 1930s
 A-50, a caesium-containing additive in the fuel JP-7
 Aerozine 50, a type of rocket fuel

Roads
 A50 highway (Canada), a road in Québec connecting the Outaouais and National Capital region and the Greater Montreal area 
 A50 road (England), a road connecting Warrington and Leicester
 A50 motorway (France), a road connecting Marseille and Toulon
 A50 road (Northern Ireland), a road connecting Portadown and Newcastle in Northern Ireland
 A50 motorway (Netherlands), a road connecting Eindhoven and Zwolle
 A50 highway (Spain), a road connecting Salamanca and Ávila
 A50 autostrada (Poland), a planned motorway being part of new Warsaw bypass

Other uses
 Queen's Pawn Game (Encyclopaedia of Chess Openings code: A50)
 FTSE China A50 Index, an stock exchange index
 Article 50 of the Treaty on European Union
 United Kingdom invocation of Article 50 of the Treaty on European Union
 Austin A50 a UK medium sized saloon car 1954-57
 Samsung Galaxy A50, smartphone released in 2019
 A-series light bulb of diameter 50 mm

See also
 List of highways numbered 50